The 2021 Porsche Carrera Cup Scandinavia was the 18th Porsche Carrera Cup Scandinavia season. It began on 7 May at Ring Knutstorp and ended on 2 October at Mantorp Park. The championship was made up the Porsche 911 GT3 Cup (Type 991 II).

Entry list

Results

Championship standings 
Race format

Race 1 is a 20-minute + 1 lap race being set by the results of Q1. Race 2 is a 30-minute + 1 lap race with 11th and below being set by Q1 results and the top 8 being set by a top-eight shootout in Q2. If there are three races, Q1 sets the grid for Race 1 and Race 2 with Q2 setting the grid for Race 3.

Scoring system

Drivers' Championship 
Those highlighted in blue are Masters' Cup entries.

Masters' Cup

Teams' Championship

Notes

References

External links 

Porsche Carrera Cup seasons